The Kehar are a clan of the Muslim Rajputs tribe of Pakistan. Kehar people are settled in the districts of Karachi, Larkana, Shikarpur, Torband etc Jacobabad, Pir Jo Goth, Khairpur in Sindh. The Kehar are also considered as a clan of the Abro tribe.

The Kehar clan, like the Bhatis, are a group/caste of people originating from Sindh province and Rajasthan in the Indian subcontinent. The Kehar primarily live in Northwestern India and Pakistan.  They are mainly found among Chandravanshi Rajputs (Bhati).  A majority of the group follow Sikhism or Hinduism; some became Muslim after the Muslim invasion.

Villages
Kehar is also the name of multiple villages in Sindh, Pakistan and in Rajasthan and Gujarat, India.

The Kehar village of the tribal chiefs is situated on the Larkana - Naudero road in Larkana District, Sindh; with a large population. To the north of the village is the rice canal, to the south, the Guava Gardens and River Indus, to the east, the "City of Shaheed", Naudero, and to its west, the City of two Prime Ministers, Larkana.

References 

Social groups of Pakistan
Sindhi tribes
Surnames